Faint Perfume is a 1925 American silent drama film directed by Louis J. Gasnier and starring Seena Owen, William Powell, and Mary Alden.

Plot
As described in a film magazine review, Ledda Perrin is in love with Barnaby Powers, the husband of her cousin Richmiel Crumb. Their child Oliver is put in the custody of Richiel by the divorce decree. However, Richmiel is unhappy with the bother of the child's care. Barnaby stops to visit Richmiel when he returns from Europe to plead for custody of the boy. While in Richmiel's room the whole family of Richmiel enters the place. Richmiel vows to spite them both by keeping possession of the child. However, when Barnaby goes to Richmiel's rooms, he finds her with her lover. She is glad to be rid of the child and Barnaby is glad to get the boy.

Cast

References

Bibliography
 Goble, Alan. The Complete Index to Literary Sources in Film. Walter de Gruyter, 1999.

External links

1925 films
1925 drama films
Silent American drama films
Films directed by Louis J. Gasnier
American silent feature films
1920s English-language films
American black-and-white films
Preferred Pictures films
1920s American films